Oland (North Frisian: Ualöönist) is a small hallig which is connected by a narrow gauge railway to the mainland and to hallig Langeneß. In 2019, the population was estimated, unofficially, to be 16 people.

Germany's smallest lighthouse is located here, being also the only one with a thatched roof.

References

External links

Halligen
Former municipalities in Schleswig-Holstein
Tidal islands of Germany
Islands of Schleswig-Holstein